Proto-punk (or protopunk) is rock music played mostly by garage bands from the 1960s to mid-1970s that foreshadowed the punk rock movement. The phrase is a retrospective label; the musicians involved were generally not originally associated with each other and came from a variety of backgrounds and styles; together, they anticipated many of punk's musical and thematic attributes.

Definition

According to the Allmusic guide:

Most musicians classified as proto-punk are rock performers of the 1960s and early-1970s, with garage rock/art rock bands the Sonics, the Velvet Underground, los Saicos, New York Dolls, MC5 and the Stooges considered to be archetypal proto-punk artists, along with glam rock band the New York Dolls.

Origins and etymology 

One of the earliest written uses of the term "punk rock" was by critic Dave Marsh who used it in 1970 to describe US group Question Mark & The Mysterians, who had scored a major hit with their song "96 Tears" in 1966. Many US bands were active in the mid-to-late 1960s playing garage rock: a ragged, highly energetic, often amateurish style of rock. While garage bands varied in style, the label of garage punk has been attributed by critic Michael Hann to the "toughest, angriest garage rockers" such as The 13th Floor Elevators and The Sonics. AllMusic states that bands like The Sonics and The Monks "anticipated" punk; the latter have likewise been cited as examples of proto-punk and The Sonics' 1965 debut album Here Are The Sonics as "an early template for punk rock". Music journalist Jason Draper cites The Rolling Stones' 1966 live album Got Live If You Want It! as another example. The raw sound and outsider attitude of psychedelic garage bands like The Seeds also presaged the style of bands that would become known as the archetypal figures of proto-punk.

Debut albums by two key US proto-punk bands were released in 1969, both from Metro Detroit in Michigan; Detroit's MC5 released Kick Out the Jams in January, and The Stooges, from Ann Arbor, premiered with their self-titled album in August. The latter album was produced by John Cale, a former member of New York's The Velvet Underground which inspired, directly or indirectly, many of those involved in the creation of punk rock. The Stooges released second album "Fun House" in 1970. Michigan, USA was also the birthplace of bands The Dogs, The Punks and Death, the latter a pioneering but commercially unsuccessful African-American proto-punk group.

Developments outside the United States
The Who released the proto-punk single "My Generation" in 1965. In the early 1970s, the UK underground counter-cultural scene centred on Ladbroke Grove in West London spawned a number of bands that have been considered proto-punk, including The Deviants, Pink Fairies,  Hawkwind, Edgar Broughton Band, Stack Waddy, and Third World War; contemporaries Crushed Butler have been called "Britain's first proto-punk band." According to Allmusic, glam rock also "inspired many future punks with its simple, crunchy guitar riffs, its outrageous sense of style, and its artists' willingness to sing with British accents (not to mention the idiosyncratic images of David Bowie and Roxy Music)". With his Ziggy Stardust persona, David Bowie made artifice and exaggeration central elements, that were later picked up by punk acts. Glam group The Hollywood Brats have likewise been cited as "proto-punk" and "Britain's answer to the New York Dolls." The Doctors of Madness built on Bowie's presentation concepts, while moving conceptually in the direction that would become identified with punk. Bands in London's pub rock scene anticipated punk by stripping the music back to its basics, playing hard, R&B-influenced rock 'n' roll; by 1974, the scene's top act, Dr. Feelgood, was paving the way for others such as the Stranglers and Cock Sparrer that would play a role in the punk explosion. Among the pub rock bands that formed that year was the 101ers, whose lead singer would two years later adopt the name Joe Strummer and form punk band The Clash.

Bands anticipating the forthcoming movement were appearing as far afield as Düsseldorf, West Germany, where "punk before punk" band NEU! formed in 1971, building on the krautrock tradition of groups such as Can. Simply Saucer formed in Hamilton, Canada in 1973 and have been called "Canada's first proto-punk band", blending garage rock, krautrock, psychedelia and other influences to produce a sound that was later described as having a "frequent punk snarl."

In Japan, the anti-establishment Zunō Keisatsu (Brain Police) mixed garage, psych and folk; the band's first two albums were withdrawn from public sale after their lyrics were found to violate industry regulations, and their "spirit.. was taken up again by the punk movement."

A new generation of Australian garage rock bands, inspired mainly by the Stooges and MC5, came even closer to the sound that would soon be called "punk": in Brisbane, the Saints (formed in 1973 but renamed in 1974) recalled the raw live sound of the British Pretty Things, who had made a notorious tour of Australia and New Zealand in 1965, while in Sydney, Radio Birdman, co-founded by Detroit expatriate Deniz Tek in 1974, began playing gigs to a small but fanatical following. The Saints are regarded as a punk band and as being "to Australia what the Sex Pistols were to Britain and the Ramones to America," while Radio Birdman are regarded as co-founders of punk but have also been designated as proto-punk.

In South America, the garage band Los Saicos appeared in Lima, Peru in 1964. They are considered the first group in history that can be classified as protopunk. One of their key songs is "Demolición", released as a single in 1965.

List of artists

Bibliography

Further reading

References

 
Punk rock genres
Garage rock
American styles of music
American rock music genres
British styles of music
British rock music genres